Derviš Sušić (3 June 1925 – 1 September 1990) was a Bosnian writer, known best for his first work I, Danilo. His political affiliations and life path had a significant impact on the themes of his literary works.

Sušić was a Yugoslav Partisan during World War II and a communist in Yugoslavia.

Works
Jabučani (1950)
S proleterima (1950)
Momče iz Vrgorca ("The Boy from Vrgorac", 1953)
I, Danilo ("Ja, Danilo", 1960)
Danilo u stavu mirno ("Danilo at Attention", 1961)
Teferič (1963)
Kurir: Roman za djecu (1964)
Drugarica istorija. Scenska igra za djecu (1965)
Pobune ("Rebellions", 1966)
 Uhode ("Spies", 1969)
Hodža straha ("The Imam of Fear", 1973)
Žestine (1976)
Tale (1980)
Parergon (1980)
Izabrana djela: I-X (1980)
Žar i mir Zar: Hronika jednog mirnodopskog ljeta negdje u Bosni (1983)
Veliki vezir. Istorijska drama u dva dijela (1984)
Izabrana djela: I-X (1985)
A. triptih (1985)
Nevakat: Roman (1987)
Jesenji cvat ("Autumn Flowering", 1988)
Drame ("Dramas", 1988)
Cvijet za čovjekoljublje (1989)

References

1925 births
1990 deaths
Bosniaks of Bosnia and Herzegovina
People from Vlasenica
Bosnia and Herzegovina writers
Bosniak writers